Margaret Thrash is an American  writer of young adult fiction and memoirist, best known for her graphic novel memoir Honor Girl.

Honor Girl, Thrash's first book, was published by Candlewick Press in 2015. The book describes her early life as a teenager coming out as a lesbian while attending conservative summer camp. It received strongly favorable reviews and was named a finalist for the 2016 Los Angeles Times Book Prize in the Graphic Novel/Comics category. Her follow-up memoir, Lost Soul Be At Peace, published in 2018, explores a period of teen depression and her relationships with her family, notably her father, a federal judge.

Thrash has also written two books in a mystery series for young adults. The first book called Strange Truth (formerly We Know It Was You) was published in 2016 by the Simon Pulse imprint of Simon & Schuster. The sequel, Strange Lies, was published in October 2017.

Harper Perennial will publish Thrash's adult debut Rainbow Black, described as "part murder mystery, part gay international fugitive love story, part meditation on queerness and identity" in Spring 2024.

Thrash currently lives in Greater Boston Massachusetts. She was a frequent contributor to Rookie, a (now defunct) online magazine for teenage girls.

References

External links

 
 
Maggie Thrash on QUEERY with Cameron Esposito
 

American female comics artists
American comics writers
LGBT comics creators
American lesbian writers
Living people
Women writers of young adult literature
American women memoirists
21st-century American memoirists
American women novelists
American writers of young adult literature
21st-century American women writers
21st-century American novelists
Hampshire College alumni
Female comics writers
The Lovett School alumni
Year of birth missing (living people)